Fairview Alpha is an unincorporated community in Natchitoches and Red River parishes in the U.S. state of Louisiana. At one time, it was known as Messick and Alpha.

History
According to the United States Geological Survey, Fairview Alpha was "originally named Messick for a family that owned a store here, however, when the Alpha School (Natchitoches Parish) and Fairview School (Red River Parish) were combined in 1912, the new name came into use".

Education 
The community is served by the Natchitoches Parish School Board.

Transportation

U.S. highways 
 U.S. 71
 U.S. 84

References

Unincorporated communities in Natchitoches Parish, Louisiana
Unincorporated communities in Red River Parish, Louisiana
Unincorporated communities in Louisiana
Populated places in Ark-La-Tex
Populated places established in 1912
1912 establishments in Louisiana